The Devon Senior Cup is the third tier county cup in the county of Devon. It is administered by the Devon County Football Association. It is open to all teams affiliated to the County FA.

History
Originally the county cup competition for the Devon County F.A., it has been superseded in importance by the Premier Cup and St Luke's Challenge Cup. The St Luke's Challenge Cup is open to affiliated teams of the Football League and steps 1-6 Leagues affiliated to Devon County F.A. Clubs may enter one team per cup competition only. The Premier and Senior Cup competitions are open to all affiliated teams of the Devon County F.A.

List of finals

19th century

20th century pre-war

20th century inter-war

20th century post-war
After 1970 the introduction of the Devon F.A. Premier Cup and the initial restriction to senior teams (i.e. no reserves initially), meant that those clubs higher up the English League pyramid no longer entered.

Note 1 - Cup was shared.

21st century

Recent finals

References

County Cup competitions